The Rural Municipality of Bayne No. 371 is a rural municipality (RM) in the Canadian province of Saskatchewan within Census Division No. 15 and  Division No. 5. It is located in the north-central portion of the province.

History 
The RM of Bayne No. 371 incorporated as a rural municipality on December 12, 1910. It was named after Deputy Minister, J. N. Bayne. Canadian Forces Station Dana was an NORAD Pinetree Line radar installation located within the RM until it was disbanded in 1987.

Heritage properties
There are two historical properties within the RM.

Sacred Heart Ukrainian Catholic Church - Constructed in 1927, on land donated by a local immigrant farmer (Nicholas Hawryluke).  The property was recognized  as a Municipal Heritage Property on May 13, 1999.
St. Laszlo Canadian Magyar Hall - Constructed between 1903–1911, the church was established by Hungarian settlers to provide a place of worship.  The hall is named after St. Laszlo.  the hall is located 6.5 km northeast of Prud'homme, Saskatchewan.

Geography

Communities and localities 
The following unincorporated communities are within the RM.

Localities
Bremen
Dana
Muskiki Springs
Peterson
Sagehill

Demographics 

Government 
The RM of Bayne No. 371 is governed by an elected municipal council and an appointed administrator that meets on the second Wednesday of every month. The reeve of the RM is Danny Picouye while its administrator is Diana Koenning. The RM's office is located in Bruno.

References 

B
Division No. 15, Saskatchewan